William Henry Tuck (27 February 1831 – 8 April 1913) was a Canadian lawyer and judge. He was Chief Justice of New Brunswick from 1896 to 1908.

References 

1831 births
1913 deaths
Judges in New Brunswick
Lawyers in New Brunswick
Canadian King's Counsel
Conservative Party of Canada (1867–1942) candidates for the Canadian House of Commons